Gulnaz Shahzadi (born 18 April 1968) is a Pakistani politician who was a Member of the Provincial Assembly of the Punjab, from May 2013 to May 2018.

Early life and education
She was born on 18 April 1968 in Lahore.

She earned a Bachelor of Science in Chemistry, Zoology and Botany in 1987. She received Bachelor of Education from the University of the Punjab in 1989.

Political career

She was elected to the Provincial Assembly of the Punjab as a candidate of Pakistan Muslim League (N) (PML-N) on a reserved seat for women in 2013 Pakistani general election.

She was re-elected to the Provincial Assembly of the Punjab as a candidate of PML-N on a reserved seat for women in 2018 Pakistani general election.

References

Living people
Punjab MPAs 2013–2018
1968 births
Pakistan Muslim League (N) MPAs (Punjab)